Rondell Bartholomew (born 7 April 1990) is a Grenadian track and field sprinter who specialises in the 400 metres. He has represented his country at two World Championships in Athletics and was a 400 m world finalist in 2011. His personal best for the event is 44.65 seconds.

He has won medals at junior level at the CARIFTA Games and Pan American Junior Championships. He helped set a Grenadian record of 3:04.69 minutes for the 4×400 metres relay in 2011.

Career

Born in Saint Patrick Parish, Grenada, he began competing in track and field at high school. Although Grenada had produced a 400 m world indoor champion in Alleyne Francique, Bartholomew stated that it was his family that provided him with inspiration to focus on running. He began competing internationally in athletics in 2008. At the CARIFTA Games that year he won the under-20's 400 m title in a personal best time of 46.86 seconds, reached the 200 metres semi-finals and also ran in both the Grenadian relay teams. He was a 400 m semi-finalist at the 2008 World Junior Championships in Athletics that July, then came sixth over the distance at the 2008 Commonwealth Youth Games (a race which was won by his younger compatriot Kirani James).

Bartholomew completed a Grenadian 1–2 finish with James at the 2009 CARIFTA Games, taking the 400 m silver medal in a personal best of 45.58 seconds (his first sub-46-second run). The duo then teamed up to win the bronze medal in the 4×400 metres relay race. At the 2009 Pan American Junior Athletics Championships, Bartholomew was again beaten by James, but managed to win the bronze medal behind American athlete Tavaris Tate. With a team including James, Akim Bowen and Josh Charles, he set a national junior record of 3:11.91 minutes for the 4×400 m relay at the championships. Bartholomew had acquired the world qualifying time and made his senior debut at the 2009 World Championships in Athletics, running in the heats of the 400 m.

He began attending South Plains College in Texas in 2010 and represented them athletically. He improved his 400 m best to 45.28 seconds with a win at the Michael Johnson Classic in Waco, Texas and claimed both the individual and relay Junior NCAA titles for South Plains. At the start of the 2011 season he won the 600 metres NCAA Indoor Junior title and came second over 200 m. He had his first run under 45 seconds at the Texas Tech Invitational, where he won the 400 m in a time of 44.65 seconds, which was the fastest time in the world at that point and brought the 21-year-old attention on the global stage. At the Penn Relays, he and Kirani James headed a 4×400 m relay team to a Grenadian record of 3:04.69 minutes – a mark which they later improved to 3:04.27 minutes at the 2011 Central American and Caribbean Championships in Athletics. He made his professional debut at the Adidas Grand Prix in New York (coming third) and also ran at the DN Galan and London Grand Prix Diamond League meetings.

He entered the 2011 World Championships in Athletics as the second fastest man in the men's 400 metres field. He made the event final and finished in sixth place with a time of 45.45 seconds, while Kirani James went on to win Grenada's first ever gold medal at the competition.

After years of battling injuries, Bartholomew returned to competition in 2016. He took part in the OECS Championships in that year and helped Grenada to secure a silver medal in the 4X400m relay at the track meet in Tortola.

The beginning of his 2017 was highlighted by a return to his home country for the inaugural Grenada Invitational where he had a season opener in the 400m with a time of 47.14.

Achievements

References

External links

Living people
1990 births
Grenadian male sprinters
South Plains College alumni
People from Saint Patrick Parish, Grenada
Olympic athletes of Grenada
Athletes (track and field) at the 2012 Summer Olympics
World Athletics Championships athletes for Grenada